The only official language of South Georgia and the South Sandwich Islands is English, and this is spoken by almost everyone on a day-to-day basis. The islands' population is transient, and there never were any native South Georgians, although a handful of people have been born there.

Current

English language
English has been used throughout the recorded history of South Georgia, from the earliest explorations by Anthony de la Roché and James Cook to the present day. It is used for the territory's administration, postage stamps and various other purposes.

The majority of the area's toponyms are either in English or anglicised, and have been given by both British and American explorers - e.g. Bird Island, Grass Island, Echo Pass, Gold Harbour and many others.

Latin
Latin is used in the motto of the islands - "Leo Terram Propriam Protegat" meaning "May the Lion protect his own land". It also appears on the church at Grytviken.

Historic
Several languages have been used historically in South Georgia.

Norwegian
 

Norwegian was used in South Georgia mainly by the numerous whalers.

Norwegian's main legacy is in a sizeable number of placenames, including Hestesletten ("Horse's Plain"), Skrap Skerries ("skrapskjaer" or "skrapskjar"), Trollhul and Elsehul. A couple of whaling stations had Norwegian names- Husvik (house bay) and Godthul (good hollow).

The first person to be born in South Georgia (and south of the Antarctic Convergence), Solveig Gunbjørg Jacobsen would have been a Norwegian speaker. The settlement Grytviken (which is a Swedish name) was founded by Carl Anton Larsen, another Norwegian speaker.

Russian
Russian was used by some explorers, such as Bellinghausen, and is retained in placenames such as Visokoi Island (высокий meaning "high"), Zavodovski and Kupriyanov Islands (Mys Kupriyanov) and Annenkov Island.

Spanish

The role of Spanish is more controversial, particularly as Argentina still contests the British claim to the islands, and considers them part of the Tierra del Fuego province.

The Compañía Argentina de Pesca operated in Grytviken until about 1960.

The Argentine naval station Corbeta Uruguay was clandestinely built on Thule Island, South Sandwich Islands on 7 November 1976, in the wake of many protests. At an early stage of the Falklands War, 32 special forces troops from Corbeta Uruguay were brought by the Argentine Navy ship Bahía Paraíso to South Georgia and landed at Leith Harbour on March 25, 1982. During this period, Argentina would have used Spanish "officially". However, Argentine control was not complete, and the Argentines in South Georgia surrendered to the British on April 25, 1982.

Spanish does not feature much in the official toponymy of the islands, other than the names of scientific bases, and Carlita Bay; however, a number of placenames have Spanish equivalents, e.g. Vindication Island is "Isla Vindicación".

Swedish language
Swedish is closely related to, and largely mutually intelligible with, Norwegian.

Placenames of Swedish origin include Grytviken (meaning "Pot Bay") and Maiviken (Norwegian spelling of the original Swedish name Majviken meaning "May Bay").

Others
Numerous other languages would have been used by explorers, whalers, sealers etc. in the vicinity, these would include Lowland Scots (along with some Scottish placenames), and German (retained in placenames such as Bertrab Glacier and Brocken).

South Georgia and the South Sandwich Islands culture